The 2012–13 Division 1 Féminine season was the 39th since its establishment. Lyon were the defending champions. The season began on 9 September 2012 and ended on 26 May 2013. The winter break was in effect from 17 December 2012 to 6 January 2013.

Teams 

There were three promoted teams from the Division 2 Féminine, the second level of women's football in France, replacing the three teams that were relegated from the Division 1 Féminine following the 2011–12 season. A total of 12 teams currently competes in the league with three clubs suffering relegation to the second division, Division 1 Féminine.

Teams promoted to Division 1 Féminine
 Arras
 Issy-les-Molineaux
 Toulouse

Teams relegated to Division 2 Féminine
 Hénin-Beaumont
 Muret
 Soyaux

Stadia and locations

League table 

Note: A win in D1 Féminine is worth 4 points, with 2 points for a draw and 1 for a defeat.

Results

Statistics

Top scorers

Source: Official Goalscorers' Standings

Top assists

Source: Official Assists' Table

References

External links 
  
 Standings and Statistics

Fra
2012–13 in French football
2012
1